The Battle of the River Garonne, also known as the Battle of Bordeaux, was fought in 732 between an Umayyad army led by Abdul Rahman Al-Ghafiqi, governor of Al-Andalus, and Aquitanian forces led by Duke Odo of Aquitaine.

Background
At the beginning of his governorship of Al-Andalus in 730 Abdul Rahman was opposed by a local Berber commander called Uthman ibn Naissa (Othman Ibn Abi Nes'ah Manuza; Othman-ben-Abou-Nessa; aka Munuza) whose stronghold was the town of Cerritania (Cerdanya, possibly the fortress of Llívia) in the Pyrenees. Munuza, hearing of the oppression of Berbers in North Africa, had made a truce with Odo, and detach from Cordovan central rule. Some accounts claim that Odo promised his daughter Lampade to Munuza in a marriage alliance. 

Odo was busy trying to fend off Charles Martel's thrust on the northern fringes of Aquitaine, so preventing the duke from assisting his southern ally. Munuza's death immediately preceded Abdul Rahman's expedition, which crossed the Pyrenees at their west end, through Navarre and rampaged its way through Gascony with great speed, first ravaging Auch, and moving on all the way to Bordeaux. The city was captured by storm, the commander of the garrison being killed in the battle.

Battle
Following the victory at Bordeaux, Abdul Rahman engaged Odo's forces on the Garonne, or possibly at the Dordogne, in his march northward. Abdul Rahman's army numbered 70,000 to 80,000 men who defeated Odo, according to Benett. However, such huge figures on the tradition of medieval chronicles have been questioned, since the expedition was an unusually large raid against the Aquitanian duke Odo (Lewis, A.R.; Collins, R.). The defeat was comprehensive and most of Odo's forces were wiped out or ran in disarray, after which the Umayyads looted the rich monasteries of northern Aquitaine before resuming their march towards Tours, a town said to be holding abundant wealth and treasures.

Aftermath
This plundering gave Odo enough time to re-organise his Aquitanian troops and according to chronicles notified Charles of the impending danger to the Frankish kingdom. The Frankish leader took notice, accepted Odo's formal submission and Odo joined Charles's army to form its left wing. The Umayyad armies were finally defeated by forces (size of the two armies is debated by modern historians) led by Charles Martel at the Battle of Tours that took place somewhere between Poitiers and Tours on 10 October, 732 (or 733 according to latest research).

The far reaching political consequences of this defeat were Charles Martel's intervention in Aquitaine, the temporary end of Basque-Aquitanian sovereignty and Odo's formal submission to Charles, confirmed after the Battle of Tours-Poitiers.

Notes

References
Blankinship, Khalid Yahya (1994). The End of the Jihad State: The Reign of Hisham Ibn 'Abd Al-Malik and the Collapse of the Umayyads. SUNY Press. 
Coppée, Henry (2002) [1881]. History of the Conquest of Spain by the Arab Moors. Gorgias Press LLC. 
Ellis, Edward Sylvester (1913). The Story of the Greatest Nations: A Comprehensive History, Extending from the Earliest Times to the Present, Founded on the Most Modern Authorities Including A Complete Chronology of the World and a Pronouncing Vocabulary Of Each Nation. New York, NY: F.R. Niglutsch.

River Garonne
River Garonne 732
River Garonne 732
Islam in France
Garonne
8th century in Al-Andalus
732
8th century in Francia
730s in the Umayyad Caliphate